This is a list of films produced by Fox Searchlight Pictures (now Searchlight Pictures) beginning in 2010 up until 2019.

References 

Disney-related lists
Lists of films by studio
Lists of films released by Disney
American films by studio